Chumki Choudhury is an Indian actress who works in Bengali cinema.

Family and Career
Chumki Choudhury was born in Kolkata. She is the daughter of famous director Anjan Choudhury and Smt. Joysree Choudhury. She passed her Madhyamik from Joysree Siksha Niketan and completed her Higher Secondary and B.A. from New Alipore College.

Chumki Choudhury made her acting debut under the direction of her father called Hirak Jayanti as a lead actress. The film was released in 1990. After doing several films, she  earned her reputation in the Bengali film industry. In 1991, the people started knowing her after acting in Babloo Samaddar’s film called ‘Abhagini’.

Chumki Chaudhury took her primary lessons in dance and music from her mother Joysree Choudhury and later on from Bani Debnath. She was involved with stage shows professionally.

Filmography

References

External links
 

1970 births
Living people
Indian film actresses
Actresses from Kolkata
20th-century Indian actresses
21st-century Indian actresses
Actresses in Bengali cinema